The 2022–23 Women's Senior T20 Challenger Trophy was the fourth edition of India's Women's T20 Challenger Trophy. Four teams, India A, India B, India C and India D, made up of the best players in India competed in the tournament. The tournament took place between 20 and 26 November 2022. It was the first T20 Challenger Trophy to take place since 2019–20. The tournament was won by India D, who beat India A by 7 wickets in the final.

Competition format
The four teams played in a round-robin group, playing each other team once, with the top two advancing to the final. Matches were played using a Twenty20 format. All matches were played at the Shaheed Veer Narayan Singh International Cricket Stadium, Naya Raipur.

The group worked on a points system with positions with the group being based on the total points. Points were awarded as follows:

Win: 4 points. 
Tie: 2 points. 
Loss: 0 points.
No Result/Abandoned: 2 points. 

If points in the final table were equal, teams were separated by most wins, then head-to-head record, then Net Run Rate.

Squads

Source: BCCI

Group stage

Points table

Source: BCCI

Fixtures

Final

Statistics

Most runs

Source: BCCI

Most wickets

Source: BCCI

References

2022–23
Women's Senior T20 Challenger Trophy
Women's Senior T20 Challenger Trophy